Ironwood Ridge High School is a public high school located in Oro Valley, Arizona.  Ironwood Ridge is one of three high schools in the Amphitheater Public School District and serves grades 9-12.  The school mascot is the nighthawk, and the school colors are navy blue and silver.  Ironwood Ridge opened in 2001 and has a student enrollment of 1,942.  The school's name originates from the abundance of desert ironwood trees in the area (the campus is also near Ironwood Forest National Monument) and the school's location in the rugged foothills of the Tortolita Mountains.

In 2007, Newsweek magazine rated Ironwood Ridge in the top 5% of public schools in the US, one of 12 Arizona schools included on the list.  The school's primary and district rival is Canyon del Oro High School, also located in Oro Valley. The school's other rivals are Marana's Mountain View High School and Cienega High School, located southeast of Tucson in Vail.

History

Population growth in Tucson's northwest suburbs
The history of Ironwood Ridge includes substantial controversy and a federal court decision from the Ninth Circuit Court of Appeals in 2000 from Republican John Pae. The Amphi School District's first high school (Amphitheater) was built in 1939, followed by Canyon del Oro High School in 1962. The school board began searching for a third high school site in the late 1970s when it became apparent that significant development would occur on the northwest side of Tucson.  Tentative deals were negotiated with developers, but by the late 1980s, all of the deals were unsuccessful, and the school district lacked a viable site for a future high school.

By 1993, overcrowding existed at a growing number of district schools, at all grade levels, in part due to the growth on the northwest side. At the time, the most critical crowding was in the elementary school grade levels. The school board noted that the overcrowding problem would eventually affect the district's high schools by the late 1990s. In 1993, the school board systematically searched for school sites on the Northwest Side where the majority of growth in the district was occurring. By early 1994, potential sites were narrowed down, and in April 1994, the school board purchased two sites adjacent to one another on the southeast corner of West Naranja Drive and North Shannon Road, at that time west of Oro Valley.

The impact of the cactus ferruginous pygmy owl
By 1994, the cactus ferruginous pygmy owl had been identified as a "species of special concern" by the US Fish and Wildlife Service (FWS).  A FWS report on the owl was published in 1994 with a map depicting the areas believed to be prime potential habitats for the owl. The two school sites were not identified as being located in those areas. The school district planned to break ground in October 1997, with the high school opening by August 1999.

In spring 1997, all the plans and blueprints for the school were completed, and the district had obtained all the required permits for construction, with the exception of one. The school site had a significant wash running through it, and the Army Corps of Engineers contended that building on such a wash constituted modifying a navigable waterway and required a 404 permit.

As the school district applied for the permit, the cactus ferruginous pygmy owl was listed as an endangered species under the Endangered Species Act (ESA) by the FWS in 1997. Within an area in Arizona designated by the FWS as critical habitat of the pygmy owl included the  owned by the school district.  were earmarked for construction of the high school, with the remaining  to remain undeveloped.

At the request of the school board, the Arizona Game and Fish Department conducted six surveys on the site and did not find ferruginous pygmy owls on the property or on the adjacent land where the owls last were sighted in early 1996. The school board then began a process with the FWS to mitigate disturbance of the potential owl habitat on the site. Negotiations with the FWS were ultimately unsuccessful, and the school district proceeded with developing the school site.

Federal lawsuit
When the school district began construction operations on the  parcel, Defenders of Wildlife (Defenders), an environmental group, brought an action for injunctive relief under Section 9 of the ESA (applicable to private parties) in the US District Court of Arizona, alleging that the proposed school construction was likely to harm or harass pygmy owls that used or inhabited the site. Defenders obtained a temporary restraining order (TRO) to halt the construction.

The Arizona District Court found that no pygmy owl had been detected anywhere within the school site, and that the evidence was insufficient to show that a pygmy owl had used any portion of the  parcel. The court also concluded that while the evidence supported an inference that a pygmy owl used the  parcel, the allegation that the construction would harm the owl lacked such support, and was weakened by inconsistent facts. As to harassment of the pygmy owl, the court determined that the evidence did not show that the bird's behavioral patterns would be adversely affected by construction of the school. In the court's view, only speculation supporting the assertion that human activity associated with the school would harass the owl.

Defenders of Wildlife appealed the District Court decision, and the case proceeded to the Ninth Circuit Court of Appeals.  The court held that the school district could not be prevented from building a school on the site.  The court asserted that critical habitat designation played no role in the case. At the time of appeal, FWS had not yet made a critical habitat designation for the pygmy owl. The Ninth Circuit found that the insufficiency of Defenders' evidence was the main issue, and any critical habitat designation would not have altered the outcome of the case.

Establishment of IRHS
The school district finally began construction of the high school following the decision in early 2000, and Ironwood Ridge opened for students in fall 2001, eliminating the overcrowding issue at Canyon del Oro High School.

Feeder schools
Ironwood Ridge is fed by Richard B. Wilson K-8 School and Coronado K-8 School.

Rivals
Ironwood's major rivals include the nearby Canyon del Oro High School and Cienega High School from Vail.

Notable alumni 
 Alex Bowman, racing driver

References

External links

Educational institutions established in 2001
Public high schools in Arizona
Schools in Pima County, Arizona
2001 establishments in Arizona